Dylan Saint-Louis (born 26 April 1995) is a professional footballer who plays as a forward and winger for Turkish club Hatayspor. Born in France, he represents Congo at international level.

Club career
Saint-Louis is a youth exponent from Saint-Étienne. He made his Coupe de la Ligue debut on 16 December 2015 against Paris Saint-Germain playing the full game.

On 31 August 2016, Saint-Louis joined Ligue 2 side Laval on a season-long loan deal.

On 23 June 2019, Saint-Louis departed Paris FC for Belgian team Beerschot, signing a three-year deal.

On 2 August 2021, he signed a three-year contract with Hatayspor in Turkey.

International career
Saint-Louis was called-up by Congo on 19 May 2017. He was part of a 43-man preliminary squad to compete in the Africa Cup of Nations qualifier against DR Congo on 10 June, but did not cap. He made his formal debut for Congo in a 2–1 2018 World Cup qualification loss to Egypt national football team on 8 October 2017.

Personal life
Saint-Louis is of Congolese and Haitian descent.

Career statistics
Scores and results list Congo's goal tally first, score column indicates score after each Saint-Louis goal.

Honours
Individual
 UNFP Ligue 2 Player of the Month: January 2018

References

External links
 
 

1995 births
People from Gonesse
Footballers from Val-d'Oise
French sportspeople of Haitian descent
French sportspeople of Republic of the Congo descent
Republic of the Congo people of Haitian descent
Living people
Republic of the Congo footballers
Republic of the Congo international footballers
French footballers
Association football forwards
AS Saint-Étienne players
Thonon Evian Grand Genève F.C. players
Stade Lavallois players
Paris FC players
K Beerschot VA players
ES Troyes AC players
Hatayspor footballers
Ligue 1 players
Ligue 2 players
Championnat National 2 players
Championnat National 3 players
Challenger Pro League players
Süper Lig players
Republic of the Congo expatriate footballers
Expatriate footballers in Belgium
Republic of the Congo expatriate sportspeople in Belgium
Expatriate footballers in Turkey
Republic of the Congo expatriate sportspeople in Turkey
French expatriate footballers
French expatriate sportspeople in Belgium
French expatriate sportspeople in Turkey